The Turcot Interchange is a three-level four-way freeway interchange within the city of Montreal, Quebec, Canada. Located southwest of downtown, the interchange links Autoroutes 15 (Décarie and Décarie South Expressways) and 20 (Remembrance Highway), and Route 136 (Ville-Marie Expressway), and provides access to the Champlain Bridge via the Décarie South Expressway. It takes its name from the nearby Philippe-Turcot Street and Turcot village, which were in turn named after Philippe Turcot (1791-1861) who was a merchant owning land in Saint-Henri.

Turcot is the largest interchange in the province and the third busiest interchange of Montreal (after Décarie and Anjou Interchanges, respectively) as of 2010, with numbers averaging a north-southbound flow of 278,000 approximate daily drivers, and over 350,000 west-eastbound in total.

The interchange underwent an extensive reconstruction commencing in 2015 which was completed by fall 2020. The $3.7-billion project is the largest roadwork in the province's history.

History 
The interchange was projected as part of the first Montreal highway in 1958 and planned to bind it to the Décarie Expressway, which was also designed at the same time. Construction started in October 1965 and Turcot was built in time for the 1967 Montreal Expo, along with other big projects such as the Montreal Metro.

Upon its erection, an old railroad yard belonging to the Grand Trunk Company (today merged into Canadian National) served as location for the interchange and was shortened by 25%, which required the demolition of a roundhouse. In 1969, upon reviewing the situation, city authorities concluded that the project used unnecessary space and could have co-existed perfectly alongside the buildings that were otherwise demolished, including some 20 residences.

When it was originally constructed, nearly the entire interchange was built high above the ground because of the cliff existing between the Upper Lachine domain and the Turcot sorting yard overtaking the old Saint-Pierre Lake basin. The highest point of the interchange is located in its southern part over the Lachine Canal to allow for the passing of ships, but the canal closed its waterway operations just three years later, in 1970.

The construction of the junction was said to be rushed during the 1960s boom, with a lack of drainage and permeable concrete, and deteriorated, with pieces of concrete slabs falling from overpass structures.

In 2000, more than 300,000 vehicles used the interchange every day, far more than the 50,000-60,000 vehicles that it had been designed to carry.

Since 2010, the interchange became subject to major repairs of the most heavily accessed ramps. During the summer of 2011, over 2.7 km (1¾ miles) worth of lanes were restored, repaved, and returned to safely accessible condition for larger vehicles.

Reconstruction 

In June 2007, the Quebec government announced the demolition and reconstruction of the structure, which was projected to be complete in 2016. The announcement came four years after a study on the interchange showed the Turcot structure was crumbling, with reports of concrete slabs up to one square metre (square yard) falling from the overpasses. In addition to a new interchange built lower to the ground, a large segment of Autoroute 20 would be rebuilt more to the north. Reconstruction of the interchange is expected to cost between $1.2 billion and $1.5 billion.

Controversy 
At the time of its announcement, the project created controversy as to how Turcot should be rebuilt. Local residents and community groups have come out against the project as proposed by the government, claiming that it will worsen pollution, increase automobile traffic downtown, and require the demolition of housing including a significant portion of the Village des Tanneries neighbourhood.

The project's environmental hearings ended on  June 19, 2009. They revealed new plans for the area by CN, as well as strong public desire to protect existing communities, rethink the modal balance of Montreal's urban transportation, and plan realistically for a future of energy shortages and environmental crisis.

After MDDEP conducted several environmental and technical impact investigations in early Summer of 2009, construction plans were halted because of the 2009 financial crisis.

Second project 

In April 2010, the city of Montreal gathered all previous commentary reviewed by BAPE and announced a different reconstruction project in which the railroad tracks and the main body of the A-20 are kept at their original location, the height of the interchange is maintained but replaced with better-lasting materials, and the former Turcot Yards serve as ground for a new urban redevelopment district with its own community aspect. The cost as set at least $5 billion, which is at least three times that of the original.

"If this project is to replace the original," stated Julie Boulet, "we can expect at least two more years of stalling," and suggested that Turcot should not be seen as a sandbox for any kind of proposals coming from all levels of the government. According to Gerald Tremblay, former mayor of Montreal, that was exactly the time necessary to prepare for the works, which were postponed into the second half of 2012.

Groundbreaking and Angrignon exit reconfiguration
Starting February 2012, the MTQ proceeded to hire excavation companies in order to start the ground leveling of the former yards in terms of the future project. The westbound lanes of the A-20 were to be moved to that location, and Boulet confirmed that the reconfiguration of the Ste-Anne-de-Bellevue—Pullman—Angrignon interchange would take place and that it was scheduled to be completed in 2018. Just as foreseen in the project, the part of the Angrignon Boulevard used as an exit overpass from the A-20 will be moved some 300 metres (330 yards) westward, forming the second half of the Sainte-Anne-de-Bellevue Boulevard intersection. The original part of Pullman Street, between Angrignon and Sainte-Anne, simply ceased to exist. As of April 2014, the works could be seen to be underway near the interchange itself, and some existing streets/exits/entrances (Girouard, Crowley (after the CUSM completion), Côte-Saint-Paul, Angrignon/Pullman) had been reconfigured to accept the new flow once the body of the A-20 was moved northward.

Completion (2015-2020)
The reconfiguration and reconstruction of the interchange commenced in 2015 and was completed by fall 2020. In October 2016, much of the old interchange was closed to allow continuous work. The $3.7-billion project was the largest roadwork in the province's history.

In popular culture 
Famous Quebec folk singer Plume Latraverse, beacon of the late 1960s counterculture and key figure at the 1976 Montreal Olympics, compared Turcot to the "functional heart" of the city, with its inward ramps being the arteries and outward ramps being the veins in the lyrics of one of his late 1970s songs.

Turcot was the setting for writer-director René Balcer's 1978 short film Turcot Interchange, a dark rom-com.

Since late 1990s, the abandoned space underneath the ramps has become a place of urban gatherings for certain graffiti artists. The artistic trio "Flow", which was also rooted in Montreal in 1993 and has long ever since moved on, is involved in producing one of the paintings on the westbound A-20 ramp, "Smashing All Toys." With criminal activity on the rise in Saint-Henri in the first half of the 2000s, this space has also been high on drug dealers and violence gangs until they were cleared by the SPVM by 2010.

See also 
 Grade separation
 Spaghetti Junction
 Freeway

References

External links

 Turcot Interchange page on the Transports Québec Website
 Mobilisation Turcot

Quebec Autoroutes
Streets in Montreal
Proposed roads in Canada
Road interchanges in Canada